On the Wings of an Eagle or Wings of an Eagle may refer to:

 On the Wings of an Eagle (album), by John Hicks, 2006
 "Wings of an Eagle", a 1972 song by Russell Morris
 Wings of an Eagle and Other Great Hits, a 1973 album by Russell Morris
 Wings Of An Eagle, a 1976 album by Mike Deasy
 "On the Wings of an Eagle", a song by John Denver on the 1998 album Forever, John
 "On the Wings of an Eagle", a song by Raven from the 1997 album Life's a Bitch
 "Wings of an Eagle", a song by Steve Bell from the 1992 album Deep Calls to Deep 
 "Wings of an Eagle", a song by Ziggy Marley from the 2009 album Family Time
 "Wings of an Eagle", a 1986 song by Deniece Williams
 "Wings of an Eagle", a 1981 song by Bobby Goldsboro
 "Wings of an Eagle", a 1941 episode of radio series Columbia Workshop

See also

Wings of Eagles (disambiguation), including "On Wings of Eagles"
Griffin, a legendary creature with the wings of an eagle